Ben Gurion High School is a high school in Petah Tikva, Israel.

Organisation
The school currently educates approximately 1600 students from across Petah Tikva.

Events
Former athlete Ben Johnson spoke against drugs, in a meeting at the school on November 20, 2008, and explained why he took performance-enhancing drugs.

References

Educational institutions with year of establishment missing
High schools in Israel
Buildings and structures in Petah Tikva
Buildings and structures in Central District (Israel)